Luke Shackleton (born 17 November 1984) is an Australian rules footballer who played with Collingwood in the Australian Football League (AFL).

Shackleton was a second round draft selection by Collingwood, on the back of his Morrish Medal winning performances with the Tassie Mariners in the 2002 TAC Cup season.

He played at Williamstown in 2003, the feeder club for Collingwood which compete in the Victorian Football League. The following year he made his AFL debut, against Richmond on the Melbourne Cricket Ground. He played as a midfielder but spent much of the match on the bench.

Delisted without playing another game, Shackleton joined the Tasmanian Devils in 2005. He later returned to his original club, the Burnie Dockers, whom he would captain in the 2011 Tasmanian Football League season.

References

External links
 
 

1984 births
Australian rules footballers from Tasmania
Collingwood Football Club players
Williamstown Football Club players
Burnie Dockers Football Club players
Tasmanian Devils Football Club players
Tassie Mariners players
Living people